Gopal Krishna Pillai or G. K. Pillai (born 30 Nov 1949) is an Indian Administrative Service (I.A.S) officer and the former Home Secretary in the Government of India. He studied at Bishop Cotton Boys' School, Bangalore and St. Joseph’s College, Bangalore, and later obtained an M.Sc from IIT, Madras. He belongs to the Kerala cadre of the 1972 batch of I.A.S. 

G.K. Pillai held diverse positions in the state government of Kerala such as:
 District Collector of Kollam from 1982 to 1985
 Special Secretary for Industries, especially the traditional industries of cashew, coir and handlooms
 Secretary of Health
 Principal Secretary to the Chief Minister of Kerala.

Media spotlight

In February 2016, Pillai claimed to media that there was political interference in the controversial Ishrat Jahan case.

Pillai's claims were corroborated by another former official in March 2016, bringing the Ishrat Jahan case into media spotlight once again.

References

"An exclusive interview with G K Pillai, Ex-Home Secretary of India".  BUREAUCRACY INDIA, Retrieved 2011-06-30

External links
https://www.adaniports.com/About-us/Board-of-Directors/Gopal-Krishna-Pillai

1949 births
Living people
Bishop Cotton Boys' School alumni
Indian Administrative Service officers
Indian Home Secretaries